The Canada national cricket team toured Barbados from October to November 1987 and played nine matches, including a limited overs fixture against the Barbados cricket team. Canada were captained by Martin Prashad. The match against Barbados was played at Kensington Oval, Bridgetown, and resulted in a win for Barbados by 3 wickets.

References

External links

1987 in Canadian sports
1987 in West Indian cricket
Canadian cricket tours of the West Indies
International cricket competitions from 1985–86 to 1988
West Indian cricket seasons from 1970–71 to 1999–2000